Hossein Korani Ameli (Hossein al-Korani al-Ameli or Ḥusayn Kūrānī or in Arabic: حسین الکورانی العاملی) was a Lebanese Shiite-Muslim cleric, one of the founders of Hezbollah in Lebanon and members of the Lebanese Hezbollah leadership council. He was the brother of Ali Al-Kourani.

Early life
Hujjat al-Islam wa l-Muslimīn Sheikh Hossein Korani Ameli was born in Yater village in Jabal Amel in southern Lebanon.

Studying in Najaf and Qom
He went to Najaf, Iraq at the age of thirteen to study religious sciences. After a while he went to Qom, Iran and stayed there for about a year and was influenced by Imam Khomeini and the Islamic Revolution of Iran.

Return to Lebanon
When he was in Iran, the Pahlavi dynasty imperial regime expelled him from Iran because of his influence from Imam Khomeini and his activities about Islamic Revolution of Iran. After being deported from Iran, Sheikh Hossein Korani Ameli with Abbas al-Musawi taught religious sciences and Persian language in the Imam al-Montazer seminary of Baalbek, Lebanon.

Iranian Revolution and return to Iran
After the Iranian Revolution, he returned to Iran. Korani had been managing Ahwaz's Arab Radio for a while, and after starting up Arab Radio in Tehran, he worked for the Arab section of Islamic Republic of Iran Broadcasting.

Return to Lebanon again
He stayed in Tehran until year 1986 and then returned to Lebanon for religious activities and promotions. When he returned to Lebanon, began to set up an Islamic center in Lebanon with the aim of publishing authentic Islamic culture and publishing his propaganda activities in Lebanon's Sha'a'ir magazine monthly.

Death
Hujjat al-Islam wa l-Muslimīn Sheikh Hossein Korani Ameli, one of the founders of Hezbollah, Lebanon, died Thursday, September 12, 2019, evening at age 64 due to cancer. He died after suffering eight months of illness. He was buried in Qom and in the Fatima Masumeh Shrine.

Following his death, Lebanon's Hezbollah, Mohammad Yazdi on behalf of Society of Seminary Teachers of Qom, Yahya Rahim Safavi, Ebrahim Raisi and Ali Akbar Salehi issued messages.

Books
He has written many books, many of them listed below:
 Fī miḥrāb Fāṭimah al-Zahrāʼ
 The infallible and the text By Ḥusayn Kūrānī; Randa Farhat; Yasin Othman; Aḥmad Mawṣililī
 al-Karāmāt al-ghaybīyah lil-Imām al-Khumaynī 
 Between modernity and eternity
 Fī al-manhaj : al-maʻṣūm-- wa-al-naṣṣ-- 
 Maqāṣid al-Basmalah : khamsūn maqālah fī al-ʻibādah wa-al-akhlāq wa-al-siyāsah al-fāḍilah
 Maʻālim al-nahj : nahj al-Imām al-Khumaynī : al-usus wa-al-maʻālim : usus wa-maʻālim li-nahj al-Imām al-Khumaynī al-muqaddas ulqiyat ʻalá majāmīʻ min al-shabāb wa-al-jāmiʻīyīn By Alī Māḥūzī; Ḥusayn Kūrānī
 Ādāb ʻaṣr al-ghaybah
 al-Ǧihād al-akbar By 	Rūḥ Allāh K̲umaynī; Ḥusayn Kūrānī
 Fī al-manhaj
 Turbat Karbalāʼ : al-ḥudūd wa-al-asrār
 Ḥawla ruʼyah al-Mahdī al-muntaẓar 
 Lamaḥāt min ḥayāt al-anbiyāʼ wa-al-mursalīn By Afāf Hādī Ṣūṣ; Ḥusayn Kūrānī
 Ruʼyat al-Mahdī al-Muntaẓar : baḥth ʻaqāʼidī, tārīkhī
 Fī rihab Karbala
 Manāhil al-rajāʼ-- : aʻmāl shahr Rajab 
 Manāhil al-rajāʼ-- : aʻmāl shahr Ramaḍān

See also
 List of Shia Muslim scholars of Islam

References

External links 
 All His Books

1955 births
Lebanese Shia Muslims
2019 deaths